The Baseball America Major League Player of the Year award is given each year by Baseball America to the best player—at any position—in Major League Baseball. (Baseball America does not have a Pitcher of the Year award.) The award was first presented in 1998.

Key

Winners
See footnotes

See also

Players Choice Awards Player of the Year (in MLB; for all positions)
Best Major League Baseball Player ESPY Award (in MLB; for all positions)
"Esurance MLB Awards" Best Major Leaguer (in MLB; for all positions) (also Best Hitter and Best Pitcher)
The Sporting News Player of the Year Award (in MLB; for all positions) (Sporting News also has a Pitcher of the Year award for each league)
The Sporting News Most Valuable Player Award (in each league) (discontinued in 1946)
Baseball Digest Player of the Year (in MLB; for position players) (from 1969 to 1993, included all positions; in 1994, a separate Pitcher of the Year award was added)
Kenesaw Mountain Landis Most Valuable Player Award (in each league; for all positions) (MLB also has the Cy Young Award for a pitcher in each league)
Baseball America Rookie of the Year

List of MLB awards

References

External links
Major League: Player of the Year (1998–present) (Baseball America Awards webpage). Baseball America website
Majors: Awards: Player Of The Year (individual articles). Baseball America website

Major League Baseball trophies and awards
Baseball most valuable player awards
Most valuable player awards
Awards by magazines
Awards established in 1998